The Langha are a Muslim community found in the states of Rajasthan and Gujarat in India. They are unrelated to the Langah clan of southern Punjab province in Pakistan.

History and origin 
The Langha and related Manganiar are both communities of folk musicians, and have two sub-divisions, the Sonia Langha and Sarengia Langha. These sub-divisions are based on the use of musical instruments used, the Sonia Langha play wind instruments such as the surnai, satara and murali at wedding ceremonies, and the Sarengia play the sarangi. The two groups are endogamous, and are further divided into clans.

According to their traditions, they were Jat   whose ancestors converted to Islam. They are said to have originated in Sindh, and settled in the village of Baranwa in Barmer District.

Present circumstances 

The community are endogamous and practice clan exogamy. Their main clans are Khaltera, Pannu, Janjarika, Kalrika and Toarika. At times of birth, marriage or any family festivity of their Sindhi-Sipahi patrons, the Langha musicians are in attendance to evoke the right mood with songs of the desert and many specially composed songs to praise the patron and his family. During the last fifteen years, many Langha have become part of the entertainment industry, and have toured the world as part of the "Festival of India" tours organized by the Indian government.

References 

Social groups of Rajasthan
Muslim communities of India
Muslim communities of Rajasthan
Social groups of Gujarat
Muslim communities of Gujarat